Putlur is a village in Anantapur district of the Indian state of Andhra Pradesh. It is the headquarters of Putlur mandal in the Anantapur revenue division.

Geography 
It has an average elevation of 246 metres (810 ft).

Demographics 
According to the Indian census, 2001, the demographic details of the Putlur mandal is as follows:
 Total Population: 	36,814	in 7,997 Households
 Male Population: 	18,756	and Female Population: 	18,058
 Children Under 6 Yrs: 4,780	(Boys – 2,366 and Girls – 2,414)
 Total Literates: 	17,456
 Ellutla was Second biggest village from this mandal

References 

Villages in Anantapur district
Mandal headquarters in Anantapur district